KIIK (1270 AM, "Talk 1270") is an American radio station licensed to serve the community of Waynesville, Missouri.  The station, established in 1968, is owned by Alpha Media and the broadcast license is held by Alpha Media Licensee LLC.

It broadcasts a talk format branded as "Talk 1270".

The station was assigned the call sign "KIIK" by the Federal Communications Commission (FCC) on September 23, 2011.

On October 15, 2017 KIIK changed their format from sports to talk, branded as "Talk 1270".

References

External links
KIIK official website

IIK (AM)
Pulaski County, Missouri
Radio stations established in 1968
Alpha Media radio stations